Eudóxia Maria Froehlich (21 October 1928 – 26 September 2015) was a Brazilian zoologist.

Life
Born in 1928, Eudóxia Maria de Oliveira Pinto was the daughter of Alice Alves de Camargo and the ornithologist Olivério Mário de Oliveira Pinto. Since she was a child, her parents used to take her and her siblings to the wooded areas near São Paulo, which helped her to become interested in zoology, especially small animals.

After finishing High School, she spent six months in Rio de Janeiro with an uncle who was a physician and returned home interested in studying medicine. Her father did not approve the idea, considering it an inappropriate career for a woman, and suggested her to study natural history and so she did. During this time she became engaged to Claudio Gilberto Froehlich, one of her colleagues.

In 1951 she and Froehlich started their doctoral studies at the Universidade de São Paulo together, having Ernst Marcus as their advisor. Marcus suggested that they should work on the taxonomy of land planarians, since it was a poorly studied but highly diverse group in the region.

She continued her studies with land planarians until 1978 and then changed her attention to arachnids. She retired in 1988, but continued her work as an emerita professor, being active until her death in 2015.

Homages 
The land planarian genus Eudoxiatopoplana, as well as the species Obama eudoxiae, Obama eudoximariae and Notogynaphallia froehlichae, were named after her.

Selected works

References 

1928 births
2015 deaths
Brazilian zoologists
Academic staff of the University of São Paulo